Swashbuckler is a 1980 board game published by Yaquinto Publications.

Gameplay
Swashbuckler is a combat game for 2-6 players set in the era of The Three Musketeers. Two maps are included: a tavern and a pirate's ship. Players can choose to be musketeers wielding rapiers, or pirates with sabres. 

In addition to counters for each character, there are also counters for tables, chairs, mugs, chandeliers, carpets, treasure chests and cannons. The rules include several basic setups. The starting locations  and facing of characters are determined randomly.

The game characterizes a free-for-all brawl where the last character standing is the winner. Before each turn, players write down a sequence of six orders for their character that can include movement; throwing mugs or daggers; swinging from the chandalier; various offensive and defensive fencing maneuvers; pulling a carpet or shoving a table (to knock another character prone); or waving a hat (which does no harm but can startle an opponent, forcing them to lose a part of their next sequence).

Reception
Paul Manz reviewed Swashbuckler in The Space Gamer No. 31. Manz commented that "Swashbuckler is a relaxing and enjoyable game. The components are of a high quality [...] it's a worthwhile investment."

In the October 1980 edition of Dragon, Bill Fawcett enjoyed the game immensely, saying, "Swashbuckler is fun. Not silly fun, or inside-joke fun, but just plain pleasant fun. Perhaps dying from a mug in the head is too ludicrous to get upset about, but for some reason this game is even fun to lose... Considering the price, the ease of play and the technical sophistication of this game, Swashbuckler could be one of your best game purchases of the year."

Reviews
Pegasus #3 (1981)
1980 Games 100 in Games
Jeux & Stratégie #13

References

Board games introduced in 1980
Yaquinto Publications games